Ruperto Biete Berdes (11 February 1906 in Barcelona – 25 March 1929) was a Spanish boxer who competed in the 1924 Summer Olympics. In 1924 he was eliminated in the quarter-finals of the flyweight class after losing his fight to Rinaldo Castellenghi.

References

External links
 

1906 births
1929 deaths
Boxers from Barcelona
Sportsmen from Catalonia
Flyweight boxers
Olympic boxers of Spain
Boxers at the 1924 Summer Olympics
Spanish male boxers